Violet Clara McNaughton (born Violet Clara Jackson; November 11, 1879 – February 3, 1968) was a Canadian journalist and agrarian feminist notable for co-establishing The Western Producer and contributing to its "Mainly for Women" pages from 1925 until her retirement in 1950. A settler and farmer of Harris, Saskatchewan (land of the Plains Cree). She was an active member of the Women's Section of the Canadian Council of Agriculture as well as the first president of the Women Grain Growers (WGG), a branch of the Saskatchewan Grain Growers Association (SGGA).  Violet McNaughton is considered the leader of women's suffrage in Saskatchewan and is recognized as the most influential Canadian farm woman of the 20th century. McNaughton was a known pacifist and supporter of women's suffrage and anti-war movements in Canada.

Violet McNaughton focused on conditions of working class Anglo-European women and families in the Canadian Prairies. She was a self described "ardent feminist" and active supporter of women, egalitarian values and co-operation. Her presence as activist and farm woman defied the strong prejudice against women farmers and laborers present in western Canada.

Personal life 
Violet McNaughton Jackson was born 1879 to Sedalia Jane Spittle and William Deleware Jackson, the eldest of three children. She lived in Borden, Kent until her immigrating to Harris at age 30 in 1909, joining her father and brother Delamark who had both previously settled. In May 1910, she married fellow homesteader John McNaughton. Soon after, McNaughton suffered serious gynecological complications in 1911, resulting in infertility.  By 1926, She had moved to Saskatoon, Saskatchewan independently and would occasionally travel between her urban and rural life, balancing familial and career obligations. McNaughton would describe her relationship as a "fifty-fifty marriage" in 1934, seeing her marriage as a partnership. Although never biologically or legally having children, McNaughton is known to have been a mothering figure for approximately five young people from the 1920s to 1930s. She died in 1968 in Saskatoon, Saskatchewan at the age of 88.

Career

Activism 
Previously a school teacher, McNaughton began her activist career in 1913, organizing a “women's congress” in association with the SGGA’s (Saskatchewan Grain Growers Association) annual general meeting, known as the Women Grain Growers (WGG) acting as its first president in 1914. McNaughton helped organize women’s chapters of United Farmers in Alberta, Manitoba and Ontario as well as the Women's Section of the Canadian Council of Agriculture serving as president from 1919 to 1923. Her activism would often fight to increase rural healthcare rights, primarily during the Spanish flu outbreak of 1918.  During the drought and following economic recession of the 1930s, McNaughton would write in favour of co-operatives and farmers rights.

In the 1940s, McNaughton’s activism focused on supporting victims of World War 2, and urging women to join the armed forces and manufacturing jobs after mass labor shortages.  In this decade she would also begin to support Métis and First Nations suffrage and social justice and would continue to support old-age pensions, and non elite historical preservation.

The Western Producer 
Before starting her journalism career, Violet McNaughton was an active spokesperson and member of Saskatchewan Grain Growers Association. In 1923, dissatisfied with the official newspaper of the SGGA, McNaughton and colleagues Harris Turner and A.P. "Pat" Waldron established The Progressive, an alternative paper built on principles of co-operation and advocating for farmers in Saskatchewan. The Progressive was a response to the growing unrest of farmers post World War 1 and its resulting recession, tariffs and grain prices. This paper would soon become the official newspaper of the SGGA, changing its name to The Western Producer (informally, The Producer) in 1924, distinguishing themselves from the similarly named Progressive Party, a federal political party. McNaughton's main contribution to the paper is as women's editor and creator of the widely successful "Mainly for Women" and "Young Co-operators" pages, which sought to make the lives of farm women and families better. These pages would grow to include a garden column, pattern service and a dating column "Mary Maple".  After her retirement in 1950, McNaughton would often write "Jottings" of her travels through Canada as well as internationally, often promoting activism, peace and the anti-nuclear movement.

Mainly For Women 
The Mainly For Women pages of the Western Producer were created in 1925 in attempt to boost female readership.  Given McNaughton's reputation through her activism work, she was recruited initially as part time endeavor which quickly became her full time occupation with its success by 1926. The pages would include discussions on education, citizenship and co-operative marketing along with current events and subjects on domestic life. The paper would be up to six pages long and include an introduction by McNaughton, articles, and popular advice column titled "Mail Bag" (also known as "Letter Box"). The first page of each edition would contain a 300-500 word "Comment" by McNaughton which she used to draw attention to specific topics and would end her entry with a question to be answered by submission in the Mail Bag column. Topics of interest include: poetry, household advice, reports from farm women's organizations and a garden forum. Despite the content not directly classified as only for white women, Native and Métis voices prevalent to the region were rarely ever acknowledged. She retired from full time editorship in 1950, but would continue an occasional column until 1959.

References

1879 births
1968 deaths
Canadian suffragists
Women in Canada
Canadian pacifists
People from Kent
Canadian women columnists
Canadian activists
Canadian women activists
Canadian farmers
Canadian women farmers
British emigrants to Canada